Saint-Ouen-de-Thouberville is a commune in the Eure department in Normandy (formerly Haute-Normandie) in north-western France.

Population

See also
Communes of the Eure department

References

Communes of Eure